Riders of the Dark is a 1928 American silent Western film directed by Nick Grinde and written by W. S. Van Dyke and Madeleine Ruthven. The film stars Tim McCoy, Dorothy Dwan, Rex Lease, Roy D'Arcy and Frank Currier. The film was released on April 21, 1928, by Metro-Goldwyn-Mayer.

Cast 
 Tim McCoy as Lt. Crane
 Dorothy Dwan as Molly Graham
 Rex Lease as Jim Graham
 Roy D'Arcy as Eagan
 Frank Currier as Old Man Redding
 Bert Roach as Sheriff Snodgrass
 Dick Sutherland as Rogers

References

External links 
 

1928 films
1920s English-language films
1928 Western (genre) films
Metro-Goldwyn-Mayer films
Films directed by Nick Grinde
American black-and-white films
Silent American Western (genre) films
1920s American films